George Simon Kaufman (November 16, 1889June 2, 1961) was an American playwright, theater director and producer, humorist, and drama critic. In addition to comedies and political satire, he wrote several musicals for the Marx Brothers and others. He won the Pulitzer Prize for Drama for the musical Of Thee I Sing (with Morrie Ryskind and Ira Gershwin) in 1932, and won again in 1937 for the play You Can't Take It with You (with Moss Hart). He also won the Tony Award for Best Director in 1951 for the musical Guys and Dolls.

Early years
George S. Kaufman was born to Joseph S. Kaufman, a hatband manufacturer, and Nettie Meyers in Pittsburgh, Pennsylvania. He had a younger sister, Ruth. His other sister was Helen, nicknamed "Helse". Kaufman's family was Jewish. He graduated from high school in 1907 and studied law for three months. He grew disenchanted and took on a series of odd jobs, selling silk and working in wholesale ribbon sales.

Career
Kaufman began contributing humorous material to the column that Franklin P. Adams wrote for the New York Mail. He became close friends with Adams, who helped him get his first newspaper job—humor columnist for The Washington Times—in 1912. By 1915 he was a drama reporter on The New York Tribune, working under Heywood Broun. In 1917 Kaufman joined The New York Times, becoming drama editor and staying with the newspaper until 1930.

Kaufman took his editorial responsibilities seriously. According to legend, on one occasion a press agent asked: "How do I get our leading lady's name in the Times?" Kaufman: "Shoot her."

Theater

Kaufman's Broadway debut was September 4, 1918, at the Knickerbocker Theatre,  with the premiere of the melodrama Someone in the House. He coauthored the play with Walter C. Percival, based on a magazine story written by Larry Evans. The play opened on Broadway (running for only 32 performances) during  that year's serious flu epidemic, when people were being advised to avoid crowds.  With "dour glee", Kaufman suggested that the best way to avoid crowds in New York City was to attend his play.

Every Broadway season from 1921 through 1958 had a play written or directed by Kaufman. Since Kaufman's death in 1961, revivals of his work on Broadway were produced in the 1960s, the 1970s, the 1980s, the 2000s, and the 2010s.  Kaufman wrote only one play alone, The Butter and Egg Man in 1925.  With Marc Connelly, he wrote Merton of the Movies, Dulcy, and Beggar on Horseback; with Ring Lardner, he wrote June Moon; with Edna Ferber, he wrote The Royal Family, Dinner at Eight, and Stage Door; with John P. Marquand, he wrote a stage adaptation of Marquand's novel The Late George Apley; and with Howard Teichmann, he wrote The Solid Gold Cadillac.  According to his biography on PBS, "he wrote some of the American theater's most enduring comedies" with Moss Hart. Their work includes Once in a Lifetime (in which he also performed), Merrily We Roll Along, The Man Who Came to Dinner, and You Can't Take It with You, which won the Pulitzer Prize in 1937.

For a period, Kaufman lived at 158 West 58th Street in New York City. The building later was the setting for Stage Door. It is now the Park Savoy Hotel, and for many years was considered a single room occupancy hotel.

Musical theater
Despite his claim that he knew nothing about music and hated it in the theater, Kaufman collaborated on many musical theater projects. His most successful of such efforts include two Broadway shows crafted for the Marx Brothers, The Cocoanuts, written with Irving Berlin, and Animal Crackers, written with Morrie Ryskind, Bert Kalmar, and Harry Ruby. According to Charlotte Chandler, "By the time Animal Crackers opened ... the Marx Brothers were becoming famous enough to interest Hollywood. Paramount signed them to a contract".  Kaufman was one of the writers who excelled in writing intelligent nonsense for Groucho Marx, a process that was collaborative, given Groucho's skills at expanding upon the scripted material. Though the Marx Brothers were notoriously critical of their writers, Groucho and Harpo Marx expressed admiration and gratitude towards Kaufman. Dick Cavett, introducing Groucho onstage at Carnegie Hall in 1972, told the audience that Groucho considered Kaufman to be "his god".

While The Cocoanuts was being developed in Atlantic City, Irving Berlin was hugely enthusiastic about including the song "Always", which he had written as a wedding present for his bride. Kaufman was less enthusiastic, and refused to rework the libretto to include this number. The song ultimately became a huge hit for Berlin, recorded by many popular performers. According to Laurence Bergreen, "Kaufman's lack of enthusiasm caused Irving to lose confidence in the song, and 'Always' was deleted from the score of The Cocoanuts – though not from its creator's memory. ... Kaufman, a confirmed misogynist, had had no use for the song in The Cocoanuts, but his disapproval did not deter Berlin from saving it for a more important occasion." The Cocoanuts would remain Irving Berlin's only Broadway musical – until his last one, Mr. President – that did not include at least one eventual hit song.

Kaufman recalled the matter differently.  In an article in Stage magazine, he recalled that Berlin woke him up at 5 am one morning to play a new song he had just written.  "Even my deficient musical sense recognized that here was a song that was going to be popular.  I listened to it two or three times, then took a stab at it myself, and as dawn came up over the Atlantic, Irving and I were happily singing 'Always' together—its first performance on any stage.  I went back to bed a happy man, and stayed happy until rehearsals started, when it turned out that 'Always' had not been written for our show at all, but purely for Irving's music-publishing house.  In its place in The Cocoanuts was a song called 'A Little Bungalow,' which we never could reprise in Act Two because the actors couldn't remember it that long."

Humor derived from political situations was of particular interest to Kaufman. He collaborated on the hit musical Of Thee I Sing, which won the 1932 Pulitzer Prize, the first musical so honored, and its sequel Let 'Em Eat Cake, as well as one troubled, but eventually successful, satire that had several incarnations, Strike Up the Band. Working with Kaufman on these ventures were Ryskind, George Gershwin, and Ira Gershwin. Also, Kaufman, with Moss Hart, wrote the book to I'd Rather Be Right, a musical starring George M. Cohan as Franklin Delano Roosevelt (the U.S. president at the time), with songs by Richard Rodgers and Lorenz Hart. He also co-wrote the 1935 comedy-drama First Lady.  In 1945, Kaufman adapted H.M.S. Pinafore into Hollywood Pinafore.

Kaufman also contributed to major New York revues, including The Band Wagon (which shared songs, but not plot with the 1953 film version) with Arthur Schwartz and Howard Dietz. His often-anthologized sketch "The Still Alarm" from the revue The Little Show lasted long after the show closed. Another well-known sketch of his is "If Men Played Cards as Women Do". Also, musicals have been based on Kaufman properties, such as the 1981 musical version of Merrily We Roll Along, adapted by George Furth and Stephen Sondheim. The musical Sherry! (1967) was based on his play The Man Who Came to Dinner.

Directing and producing

Kaufman directed the original or revival stage productions of many plays and musicals, including The Front Page by Charles MacArthur and Ben Hecht (1928), Of Thee I Sing (1931 and 1952), Of Mice and Men by John Steinbeck (1937), My Sister Eileen by Joseph Fields and Jerome Chodorov (1940), Hollywood Pinafore (1945), The Next Half Hour (1945), Park Avenue (1946, also co-wrote the book), Town House (1948), Bravo! (1948, also co-wrote the script), Metropole (1949), the Frank Loesser musical Guys and Dolls, for which he won the 1951 Best Director Tony Award, The Enchanted (1950), The Small Hours (1951, also co-wrote the script), Fancy Meeting You Again (1952, also co-wrote the script), The Solid Gold Cadillac (1953, also co-wrote the script), and Romanoff and Juliet by Peter Ustinov (1957).

Kaufman produced many of his own plays, as well as those of other writers. For a short time, from circa 1940 to 1946, Kaufman, with Moss Hart and Max Gordon, owned and operated the Lyceum Theatre.

Film and television
Many of Kaufman's plays were adapted into Hollywood and British films.  Among the more well-received were Dinner At Eight, Stage Door (almost completely rewritten by others for the film version) and You Can't Take It with You (changed significantly by others for the film version), which won the Best Picture Oscar in 1938, and The Dark Tower. He also occasionally wrote directly for the movies, most significantly the screenplay for A Night at the Opera for the Marx Brothers. His only credit as a film director was The Senator Was Indiscreet (1947) starring William Powell.

From 1949 until midway through the 1952–1953 season, he appeared as a panelist on the CBS television series This Is Show Business. Kaufman made a remark about the excessive airing of "Silent Night" during the Christmas season, "Let's make this one program", he said, "on which no one sings 'Silent Night'."  The resulting public outcry prompted his dismissal by CBS.  In response, Fred Allen said, "There were only two wits on television: Groucho Marx and George S. Kaufman.  Without Kaufman, television has reverted to being half-witted."  It would be more than a year before Kaufman appeared on TV again.

Bridge

Kaufman was a prominent player of bridge, probably both auction bridge and contract bridge. The New Yorker published many of his humorous items about the card game; at least some have been reprinted more than once, including:
"Kibitzers' Revolt"  and the suggestion that bridge clubs should post notice whether the North–South or the East–West pairs are holding good cards.
Kaufman was notoriously impatient with poor players. One such partner asked permission to use the men's room, according to legend, and Kaufman replied: "Gladly. For the first time today I'll know what you have in your hand."
On sitting South: (1) "No matter who writes the books or articles, South holds the most terrific cards I ever saw. There is a lucky fellow if ever I saw one." (2) Oswald Jacoby reported a deal that Kaufman played marvelously in 1952, after which he cracked, "I'd rather sit South than be the President."
On , "I'd like a review of the bidding with all the original inflections."

His first wife Beatrice Bakrow Kaufman was also an avid bridge player, and an occasional poker player with Algonquin men, who wrote at least one New Yorker article on bridge herself, in 1928.

Personal life

In the 1920s, Kaufman was a member of the Algonquin Round Table, a circle of writers and show business people. From the 1920s through the 1950s, Kaufman was as well known for his personality as he was for his writing. In the Moss Hart autobiography Act One, Hart portrayed Kaufman as a morose and intimidating figure, uncomfortable with any expressions of affection between human beings—in life or on the page. Hart writes that Max Siegel said: "Maybe I should have warned you. Mr Kaufman hates any kind of sentimentality—can't stand it!"
This perspective, along with a number of taciturn observations made by Kaufman himself, led to a simplistic but commonly held belief that Hart was the emotional soul of the creative team while Kaufman was a misanthropic writer of punchlines.  Kaufman preferred never to leave Manhattan. He once said: "I never want to go any place where I can't get back to Broadway and 44th by midnight."

Called "Public Lover Number One", he "dated some of the most beautiful women on Broadway". Kaufman found himself in the center of a scandal in 1936 when, in the midst of a child custody suit, the former husband of actress Mary Astor threatened to publish one of Astor's diaries purportedly containing extremely explicit details of an affair between Kaufman and the actress. The diary was eventually destroyed by the court, unread, in 1952, but details of the supposed contents were published in Confidential magazine, Hollywood Babylon by Kenneth Anger (Both always have been considered unreliable sources) and in various other questionable publications. Some of the sexually explicit portions of Mary Astor’s writing about Kaufman were reprinted in New York magazine in 2012 and Vanity Fair magazine in 2016. Kaufman had an affair with actress Natalie Schafer during the 1940s.

Kaufman joined the theater club, The Lambs, in 1944.

Kaufman was married to his first wife Beatrice from 1917 until her death in 1945. They had one daughter, Anne Kaufman (Booth). Four years later, he married actress Leueen MacGrath on May 26, 1949, with whom he collaborated on a number of plays before their divorce in August 1957. Kaufman died in New York City on June 2, 1961, at the age of 71. His granddaughter, Beatrice Colen, was an actress who had recurring appearances on both Happy Days and Wonder Woman.

In 1979, Donald Oliver compiled and edited a collection of Kaufman's humorous pieces, with a foreword by Dick Cavett.

Portrayals
Kaufman was portrayed by the actor David Thornton in the 1994 film Mrs. Parker and the Vicious Circle and by Jason Robards in the 1963 film Act One. In the 2014 Broadway adaptation of the latter by James Lapine, he was played by Tony Shalhoub.

The title character of the 1991 Coen brothers film Barton Fink, who is a playwright, bears a strong physical resemblance to Kaufman.

Kaufman is portrayed in the film Mank by actor Adam Shapiro.

Awards

Notes

References

External links

 
 George S. Kaufman at Internet Off-Broadway Database
 
 
George S. Kaufman Papers  at the Wisconsin Center for Film and Theater Research
George S. Kaufman Papers at the Library of Congress
George S. Kaufman.com
George S. Kaufman at doollee.com , The Playwrights Database
 (a tribute to Kaufman)
 

1889 births
1961 deaths
20th-century American dramatists and playwrights
20th-century American non-fiction writers
American contract bridge players
American humorists
American people of German-Jewish descent
American theater critics
American theatre managers and producers
Contract bridge writers
Donaldson Award winners
Jewish American dramatists and playwrights
Jewish contract bridge players
Jewish theatre directors
Pulitzer Prize for Drama winners
The New Yorker people
Writers from Pittsburgh
Algonquin Round Table